Allison & Busby (A & B) is a publishing house based  in London established by Clive Allison and Margaret Busby in 1967.  The company has built up a reputation as a leading independent publisher.

Background
Launching as a publishing company in May 1967, A & B in its first two decades published writers including Sam Greenlee, Michael Moorcock, H. Rap Brown, Buchi Emecheta, Nuruddin Farah, Rosa Guy, Roy Heath, Aidan Higgins, Chester Himes, Adrian Henri, Michael Horovitz, C. L. R. James, George Lamming, Geoffrey Grigson, Jill Murphy, Andrew Salkey, Ishmael Reed, Julius Lester, Alexis Lykiard, Colin MacInnes, Arthur Maimane, Adrian Mitchell, Ralph de Boissière, Gordon Williams, Alan Burns, John Clute, James Ellroy, Giles Gordon, Clive Sinclair, Jack Trevor Story, John Edgar Wideman, Val Wilmer, Margaret Thomson Davis, Dermot Healy, Richard Stark, B. Traven, Simon Leys, and others.

Among the imprint's original titles are The Spook Who Sat by the Door (1969), Behold the Man (1969), The Final Programme (1969), The English Assassin (1972), The Worst Witch (1974), The Bride Price (1976), The Lives and Times of Jerry Cornelius (1976), The Condition of Muzak (1977), Gloriana (1978), The Chairman's New Clothes: Mao and the Cultural Revolution (1979), and The True History of the Elephant Man (1980).

The company was acquired by W. H. Allen Ltd in 1987, was subsequently part of Virgin Publishing, and has since "evolved and thrived under various independent managers", including Peter Day and David Shelley. A & B is now owned by Spanish publisher Javier Moll's Editorial Prensa Ibérica. The current Publishing Director, appointed in 2005, is Susie Dunlop, and the imprint publishes "an array of books, from crime and thrillers to literary, historical and women's fiction, to fantasy, memoirs, and books on popular culture."

At the time of the company's founding, Margaret Busby was the UK's youngest and the first black woman publisher; she left the company in 1987. Clive Allison died on 25 July 2011.

References

External links
 Allison & Busby website.
 Allison & Busby Books on Facebook.

1967 establishments in England
Allison and Busby books
Book publishing companies based in London
British companies established in 1967
Publishing companies based in London
Publishing companies established in 1967